Tanying Area is an area and an ethnic township located in the Miyun District of Beijing, China. Located on the south of Ye Mountain (冶山), it shares border with Mujiayu Town in its north and east, Gulou Subdistrict in its southwest, and Miyun Town in its northwest. In 2020, the area had 15,466 inhabitants under its administration.

The name Tanying originates in 1777, when the region, which was called Tan Department (檀州) at the time, was used as a garrison for stationing Eight Banners troops.

History

Administrative divisions 
In 2021, Tanying Area is formed from 3 residential communities, and they are organized in the following table:

Gallery

See also 
 List of township-level divisions of Beijing

References

Miyun District
Ethnic townships of the People's Republic of China
Areas of Beijing